Ashteroth Karnaim ( ʿAštərōṯ Qarnayīm), also rendered as Ashtaroth Karnaim, was a city in the land of Bashan east of the Jordan River.

A distinction is to be made between two neighbouring cities: Ashtaroth, and northeast of it Karnaim, the latter annexing the name of the former after Ashtaroth's decline and becoming known as Ashteroth Karnaim.

Ashteroth Karnaim was mentioned under this name in the Book of Genesis, and in the Book of Joshua where it is rendered simply as "Ashtaroth". Karnaim is also mentioned by the prophet Amos (Book of Amos 6:13) where those in Israel are boasting to have taken it by their own strength. 

Karnaim/Ashteroth Karnaim is considered to be the same with Hellenistic-period Karnein of 2 Maccabees 12:21, rendered in the King James Version as  Carnion, and possibly as "Carnaim" in 1 Maccabees.

Eusebius (c. 260/265–340) writes of Karneia/Karnaia, a large village in "Arabia", where a house of Job was identified by tradition.

Ashteroth in the Assyrian relief
Ashteroth (Tell Ashtara) is mentioned in the Assyrian relief in 730/727 BC, stored in the British Museum. It is a town where Levites lived. It is mentioned twice in the cuneiform Amarna letters from Tell el-Amarna in 1350 BC. The relief depicts the Assyrians removing the people from Ashteroth in 730–727 BC. The relief was excavated at Nimrud by Sir Austen Henry Layard in 1851. The name Ashteroth is inscribed in cuneiform  script on the top of the relief. The king in the lower register is Tiglath-pileser III. This is the first exile of the people out of Israel into Assyria. This event is mentioned in the Bible in 2 Kings 15:29. (“In the days of Pekah king of Israel came Tiglath-pileser king of Assyria, and took Ijon, and Abel-beth-maachah, and Janoah, and Kedesh, and Hazor, and Gilead, and Galilee, all the land of Naphtali, and carried them captive to Assyria.”) 

The Assyrians came back in 722/721 BC and removed the 10 tribes of Israel out of Israel and brought them to Assyria. This relief is hugely important because it shows the beginning of the exile of the 10 tribes of Israel. They never returned. You can see a mound below the town in the relief. That means there was a tell below the town. A tell is where the town is built on top of the previous demolished buildings and pottery etc. The floppy turbans and pointed shoes and the style of the cloaks are typical for Israel at that period. You can see that the same clothes are shown on the Black Obelisk of Shalmaneser III, which is very close to it in the Assyrian section of the British Museum in London. The Black Obelisk is dated to about 825 BC. It was also excavated at Nimrud by Sir Austen Henry Layard in 1848. It shows king Jehu of Israel (or his representative) offering tribute to Shalmaneser III on the second register down. The clothes are the same as on the Ashteroth relief.

Etymology
The name translates literally to "Astarte of the Horns"; Astarte was a fertility goddess in ancient Canaanite religion, and "horns" were symbolic of mountain peaks.

Identification
The identification of the two sites is not straightforward, but there is some degree of consensus.

Ashtaroth
 Tell Ashtara, north of the River Yarmouk, is a site considered to be identical with Ashtaroth, a city mentioned in several Egyptian sources: the  Execration texts, Amarna letters (mid-14th century BCE) and the campaign list of Ramesses III (r. 1186 to 1155 BCE). The city appears in Amarna letters EA 256 and EA 197 as Aštartu. In the Hebrew Bible it is mentioned as the capital of King Og of Bashan ( etc.) and as part of the territory of Manasseh.

Karnaim/Ashteroth Karnaim
All sites identified by different scholars at different times as Karnaim/Ashteroth Karnaim lay in modern Syria in the area of Daraa.
 Al-Shaykh Saad is widely seen as the site of Ashteroth Karnaim

Other possible sites proposed in the past are:
 Al Churak, a site proposed by 14th-century topographer and traveller Ishtori Haparchi, aka Astori Pharchi, being eight miles northeast of the ancient ruins known as 'Draä'
 Muzayrib, an ancient fortress town

References

Bibliography

Canaanite cities
Torah cities
Book of Genesis
Book of Joshua
Book of Amos
Books of the Maccabees
Levitical cities
Astarte